The Gainesville Mall was the first enclosed shopping mall in Gainesville, Florida.  It located on the northwest corner of the intersection of NW 13th Street (US 441) and NW 23rd Avenue and operated from 1969 to 1993.

When it opened in 1969, it has two anchors: Sears on the south side, and Tampa-based Maas Brothers on the north side.  The mall played a major role in establishing a retail corridor along NW 13th Street.  This retail corridor would end up replacing downtown Gainesville as the area's commercial center. 

In 1978, The Oaks Mall, a larger indoor mall, opened across town near Interstate 75.  Sears would relocate to its store to The Oaks Mall in 1983, leaving Maas Brothers as the only anchor at the Gainesville Mall.

In 1991, Maas Brothers was merged with Burdines by the parent company of the two stores.  Despite the fact that Burdines operated a store at The Oaks Mall since 1983, the company retained its store at the Gainesville Mall for a few years.  The Maas Brothers store was officially rebranded as Burdines on October 20, 1991.

The Gainesville Mall closed permanently in 1993 after years of decline.  The mall was demolished in 2004, and a Lowe's now sits on the former site, which opened in 2006.

References

Demolished shopping malls in the United States